The Dome of the Ascension is a small Islamic free-standing domed structure built by the Umayyads that stands just north the Dome of the Rock (Arabic: قبة الصخرة Qubbat aṣ-Ṣakhra) on the al-Aqsa compound in Jerusalem.

It commemorates the Islamic Prophet Muhammad's ascension to heaven, according to Islamic tradition. The Dome of the Ascension is part of the Muslim prayer-route.

History
The original edifice was probably built by either the Umayyads or the Abbasids (sometime between 7th-10th centuries). The dome’s exact year of construction and its founder’s name remain unknown.

The current edifice was built by the Ayyubid governor of Jerusalem, Izz ad-Din az-Zanjili (Amir ʿIzz ad-Din ʿUthman bin ʿAli Abdullah az-Zanjili) in 1200 or 1201 (during Sultan Al-Adil I’s reign), using Crusader construction materials. An Arabic inscription dated to 1200 or 1201 (597 AH) describes it as renovated and rededicated as a waqf. 

The structure, notably its column capitals, are of Frankish style and construction, but some repair or renovation was done in or after the Ayyubid dynasty period.

Architecture
The Dome of the Ascension is a small octagonal dome based on 30 marble columns (in clusters of three or four). The open space between the columns was later sealed using marble slabs. The dome was covered with lead sheets, but they were recently replaced by white stone plates. Today, the dome is covered with marble slabs between the marble columns that keep it standing, and there is an entrance door on the north side of the structure. In the southern part of the dome, it has a mihrab (a niche pointing towards the qibla). 

What makes this dome stand out is the crown-like mini-dome (a monopteros-like cupola) on top of its main dome.

Its architectural style can be defined as Umayyad or Abbasid, although its current edifice is Ayyubid and construction materials are from the Crusaders.

References

External links
 

Ascension
Octagonal buildings
Temple Mount
Catholic Church in Israel
Buildings and structures of the Catholic Church in Asia

he:מבני הר הבית#כיפת העלייה